Novel coronavirus (nCoV) is a provisional name given to coronaviruses of medical significance before a permanent name is decided upon. Although coronaviruses are endemic in humans and infections normally mild, such as the common cold (caused by human coronaviruses in ~15% of cases), cross-species transmission has produced some unusually virulent strains which can cause viral pneumonia and in serious cases even acute respiratory distress syndrome and death.

Species
The following viruses could initially be referred to as "novel coronavirus", before being formally named:

All four viruses are part of the Betacoronavirus genus within the coronavirus family.

Etymology
The word "novel" indicates a "new pathogen of a previously known type" (i.e. known family) of virus. Use of the word conforms to best practices for naming new infectious diseases published by the World Health Organization (WHO) in 2015. Historically, pathogens have sometimes been named after locations, individuals, or specific species. However, this practice is now explicitly discouraged by the WHO.

The official permanent names for viruses and for diseases are determined by the ICTV and the WHO's ICD, respectively.

At the beginning of the COVID-19 pandemic in Hubei a 2020 study from the University of Alabama at Birmingham found a more than ten-fold increase in use of expressions such as "Chinese virus" or "Wu flu virus" on Twitter compared to before the outbreak. The researchers voiced concerns whether such terminology could hinder public health efforts or be stigmatizing. No such effects were observed in the wake of the MERS outbreaks being referred to as "Camel flu virus" or "Middle East virus".

See also 
 Coronavirus
 Coronavirus diseases
 Coronavirus 229E
 Coronavirus OC43
 Coronavirus NL63
 Bat SARS-like coronavirus WIV1
 Bat-borne viruses

References 

Coronaviridae